USS Glacier may refer to:

 , launched as SS Port Chalmers 22 July 1891; purchased, commissioned, renamed Delmonico in 1898 and then Glacier in the same year; decommissioned and sold in 1922
 , a Prince William-class escort carrier, LR number: 6115266 launched in 1942; transferred to the Royal Navy in 1943 and served during World War II as HMS Atheling;  struck in 1947
 , later (WAGB-4), an icebreaker of unique design, LR number: 6123672, launched in 1954 and struck in 1966

United States Navy ship names